Francis "Frank" William Cavanaugh (April 28, 1876 – August 29, 1933) was an American college football player and coach. He served as the head football coach at University of Cincinnati in 1898, the College of the Holy Cross from 1903 to 1905, Dartmouth College from 1911 to 1916, Boston College from 1919 to 1926, and Fordham University from 1927 to 1932, compiling a career college football coaching record of 145–48–17. Cavanaugh played football at Dartmouth as an end from 1896 to 1897. Nicknamed "Cav" and "The Iron Major," he was inducted into the College Football Hall of Fame as a coach in 1954.

Early life and playing career
Born in Worcester, Massachusetts, Cavanaugh played college football as an end at Dartmouth College from 1896 to 1897, under coach William Wurtenburg.

Coaching career and military service
Cavanaugh served as the head football coach at the University of Cincinnati in 1898, followed with a stint coaching at the Denver Athletic Club  from 1898 to 1903. He then returned to his native Worcester to coach at the College of the Holy Cross from 1903 to 1905, followed by high school coaching at Worcester Academy from 1909 to 1910.

Cavanaugh left Worcester to return to college football at his alma mater, Dartmouth from 1911 to 1916. There, he coached Lawrence Whitney, who also attended Worcester Academy when Cavanaugh coached there. Cavanaugh left Dartmouth  in 1917 to enter the United States Army to serve during World War I. He rose to the rank of major and was seriously wounded during the Meuse–Argonne offensive on October 23, 1918. Shellfire broke his cheek, nose, and skull, all of which contributed to later blindness.

In 1919, Cavanaugh published a book entitled Inside Football.

Cavanaugh's final two coaching stints were at Boston College  from 1919 to 1926 and Fordham University from 1927 to 1932. At Fordham, he implemented the T formation on offense. He finished career with a college coaching record of 148–50–18.

Death and honors
At the time of his death in 1933, Cavanaugh was bankrupt. He was survived by his widow, Florence Ayres, and their seven children.

On October 25, 1943, a biographical film about Cavanaugh's life was released by RKO Pictures titled The Iron Major, based on his wife's recounts. The actor Pat O'Brien portrayed Cavanaugh's in the main role. In 1954, Cavanaugh was posthumously inducted into the College Football Hall of Fame as a coach.

Head coaching record

College

References

External links
 

1876 births
1933 deaths
19th-century players of American football
American football ends
Sportspeople with a vision impairment
Players of American football from Worcester, Massachusetts
United States Army personnel of World War I
Dartmouth Big Green football players
Cincinnati Bearcats football coaches
Holy Cross Crusaders football coaches
Dartmouth Big Green football coaches
Boston College Eagles football coaches
Fordham Rams football coaches
High school football coaches in Massachusetts
College Football Hall of Fame inductees